BSE Pro (Formerly Blood Sweat and Ears) (or BSE Wrestling) was a Canadian independent professional wrestling organization, founded in 2005. It held 10-12 events a year in the Greater Toronto Area, as well as quarterly tours to Northern Ontario cities such as Timmins, Sudbury, Iroquois Falls, Kirkland Lake and North Bay. It evolved into Maximum Pro Wrestling after it merged with fellow Canadian promotion Border City Wrestling in 2010.

History
BSE's first show was held on July 10, 2005, at the Nashville North nightclub in Norval, Ontario. As was usual at the start of the promotion, the show was split between wrestling and music, with local band Severity playing two sets. The main event that night featured Rhyno. Also appearing were The Highlanders, Shantelle Taylor and Tiana Ringer.

The next show, in August, featured a main event pitching Christopher Daniels in a Fatal 3way against Chris Sabin and Petey Williams, as well as featuring Bobby Roode. 2005 was completed with a show in Mississauaga on 30 October, featuring Bobby Roode, Traci Brooks and Chris Kanyon, as well as a main event match between Chris Sabin and Petey Williams.

On February 5, held their first show of 2006 in Sudbury, Ontario, during which Chris Kanyon revealed that he was homosexual. Throughout the remainder of 2006, BSE brought in more outside stars including Eric Young, Tommy Dreamer, Abyss, Christian Cage, Gail Kim, AJ Styles, Monty Brown, Steve Corino, Senshi, Lance Storm and Pat Tanaka, a tactic that saw the number of fans at shows rise from 200 to around 750.

BSE Wrestling was brought to the attention of a wider audience at the 2008 CHIKARA King of Trios tournament. Team BSE, consisting of Kobra Kai, La Sombra Canadiense and Super Xtremo were involved in the second night of matches, facing Elite Pro Wrestling's representatives Da Soul Touchaz (Acid Jaz, Willie Richardson & Marshe Rockett) in the first round. However, as the three were not natural teammates, and were instead put together as a team to promote BSE Wrestling, they did not work as a team and were eliminated by Da Soul Touchaz after Willie Richardson pinned La Sombra Canadiense.

On July 22, BSE announced a free show in Mississauga, Ontario in association with The Discovery Channel's Guinea Pig show.  The show's host Ryan Stock took part in the main event Extreme Rules match against Franky the Mobster. The show was recorded for broadcast on the Discovery Channel at a later date. In August 2008, BSE embarked on a cross-provincial wrestling tour, in support of the United Way. Spanning Ontario, Manitoba and Saskatchewan, the tour included characters Randy and Mr. Lahey from the Trailer Park Boys, Joe E. Legend, Rhino, and Tracy Brooks during certain stops.

On February 3, 2010 it was announced that Windsor's Border City Wrestling owner Scott D'Amore has left TNA Wrestling and has announced that his promotion, will be merging with BSE Pro, to become one of North America's largest and longest running independent wrestling company under the new banner, Maximum Pro Wrestling.

Squared Circle Training
The BSE promotion is partnered with Squared Circle Training, a pro wrestling school in Toronto run by Rob Fuego and Steve Cvetkovich (Kobra Kai). Alumni include TNA Knockouts Gail Kim, Angel Williams, Traci Brooks and Shantelle Taylor aka Taylor Wilde, as well as a number of independent wrestlers such as Tiana Ringer, Xtremo and Brian Youngblood.

Championships

BSE Suicide Six-Pack Championship

BSE Tag Team Championship

BSE Adrenaline Cup

BSE Arctic Championship

Alumni

Abyss
AJ Styles
Angelina Love
Christian Cage
Christopher Daniels
Chris Kanyon
Chris Sabin
Christy Hemme
Cody Deaner
Danyah Rivietz
Doug Basham
Eric Young
Gail Kim
Jay Lethal
Joe Doering
Joe E. Legend
Kurt Angle
Lance Storm
LR11
Matt Morgan
Murat Bosporus
Rhino
Robbie McAllister
Robert Roode
Rory McAllister
Samoa Joe
Senshi
Shawn Spears
Sinn Bowdee
Tommy Dreamer
Vane

Accolades
 Ontario Indy Wrestling Awards
 Promotion Of The Year - 2008, 2009

Notes

External links
Results at Online World of Wrestling

Companies established in 2005
Companies disestablished in 2010
Canadian professional wrestling promotions
Professional wrestling in Toronto